Teratoscincus bedriagai, also known commonly as Bedraiga's wonder gecko or Bedriaga's plate-tailed gecko, is a small species of lizard in the family Sphaerodactylidae. The species is native to Central and Western Asia.

Etymology
The specific name, bedriagai, is in honor of Russian herpetologist Jacques von Bedriaga.

Geographic range
T. bedriagai is native to the northern and eastern desert basins of the central Plateau of Iran, Sistan, and the desert regions of southern Afghanistan as far east as Kandahar. Ecological variables tested for T. bedriagai found that isothermality was more important with 32% contribution.

Habitat

Reproduction
T. bedriagai is oviparous.

References

Further reading
Nikolsky AM (1900). "[Two new species of Teratoscincus from eastern Persia]". Annuaire du Musée Zoologique de l'Académie Impériale des Sciences de St.-Pétersbourg 4 (2): 145–147. (Teratoscincus bedriagai, new species, pp. 146–147). (Title of article in Russian, text in Latin and Russian).
Sindaco R, Jeremčenko VK (2008). The Reptiles of the Western Palearctic. 1. Annotated Checklist and Distributional Atlas of the Turtles, Crocodiles, Amphisbaenians and Lizards of Europe, North Africa, Middle East and Central Asia. (Monographs of the Societas Herpetologica Italica). Latina, Italy: Edizioni Belvedere. 580 pp. .

Teratoscincus
Reptiles described in 1900
Taxa named by Alexander Nikolsky